Kokelv is a village in Hammerfest Municipality in Troms og Finnmark county, Norway.  The village is located on the mainland, along the Revsbotn fjord, at the mouth of the river Russelva.  Kokelv Church is located in this village.

References

Villages in Finnmark
Hammerfest
Populated places of Arctic Norway